Lu Kang (226 – August or September 274), courtesy name Youjie, was a Chinese military general and politician of the state of Wu during the Three Kingdoms period of China. He was the second son of Lu Xun, the third Imperial Chancellor of Wu. Lu Kang inherited the mantle of his father but was less involved in politics as he served mainly in the Wu military. He rose to prominence during the reign of the fourth and last Wu emperor, Sun Hao. In 272, he successfully suppressed a rebellion by Bu Chan and fended off invading forces from Wu's rival, the Jin dynasty. After the Battle of Xiling, he actively pursued a policy of détente with the Jin general Yang Hu at the Wu–Jin border. At the same time, he constantly submitted memorials to Sun Hao, urging the tyrannical emperor to change his ways and govern with benevolence, but his advice fell on deaf ears. In 280, about six years after Lu Kang's death, the Jin dynasty launched a campaign against Wu and conquered Wu within a year.

During Sun Quan's reign
Lu Kang was the second son of Lu Xun and a maternal grandson of Sun Ce, the elder brother and predecessor of Wu's founding emperor, Sun Quan. Lu Xun died in 245 when Lu Kang was only around 19 years old. After his father's death, Lu Kang was commissioned as Colonel Who Establishes Martial Might and put in charge of 5,000 troops who had been under his father's command. After escorting his father's coffin from Wuchang (武昌; present-day Ezhou, Hubei) back to his ancestral home in Wu Commandery (around present-day Suzhou, Jiangsu) for burial, he travelled to the Wu capital Jianye (present-day Nanjing, Jiangsu) to pay his respects to Sun Quan. In Jianye, Sun Quan showed Lu Kang a list of 20 offences allegedly committed by Lu Xun and questioned Lu Kang about them. He did not allow Lu Kang to meet anyone and interrogated him together with a panel of officials. Lu Kang cooperated and responded truthfully. Sun Quan's anger towards Lu Xun gradually subsided.

In 246, Lu Kang was promoted from Colonel to General of the Household and ordered to switch posts with Zhuge Ke – he would leave Wuchang and move to Chaisang (柴桑; around present-day Jiujiang, Jiangxi) while Zhuge Ke would do vice versa. Before Lu Kang left, he had the city walls repaired and his residence renovated while leaving his fruit orchards intact. When Zhuge Ke arrived in Chaisang, he was surprised to see that Lu Kang had left behind a well-maintained residence for him. He also felt ashamed because his garrison at Chaisang was in poor condition when he departed.

In 251, Lu Kang fell sick so he went to Jianye to seek medical treatment. When his condition improved and he was preparing to leave, Sun Quan came to bid him farewell. With tears in his eyes, Sun Quan told Lu Kang: "Previously, I believed slanderous rumours and failed to understand your father's well-meaning advice. I have let you down. I have burnt all the documents containing the allegations against your father so that nobody can ever see them."

During the reigns of Sun Liang and Sun Xiu
Sun Quan died in 252 and was succeeded by his youngest son, Sun Liang, as emperor of Wu. After his coronation, Sun Liang promoted Lu Kang to the rank of General under the title "General of Vehement Might". In 257, Zhuge Dan, a general from Wu's rival state Wei, started a rebellion in Shouchun (壽春; present-day Shou County, Anhui) and requested reinforcements from Wu. Sun Liang appointed Lu Kang as the Area Commander of Chaisang (柴桑; around present-day Jiujiang, Jiangxi) and ordered him to lead troops to Shouchun to support Zhuge Dan. Although the rebellion was ultimately suppressed by Wei forces, Lu Kang managed to defeat some Wei forces in battle. In recognition of his efforts, the Wu government promoted him to the position of General Who Attacks the North.

In 259, during the reign of Sun Liang's successor Sun Xiu, Lu Kang was appointed as General Who Guards the Army and placed in charge of Xiling (西陵; around present-day Yichang, Hubei). The area under his jurisdiction covered the lands from Guan Yu's Shallows to Baidicheng. Sun Xiu granted him acting imperial authority in the following year.

Early career under Sun Hao
Sun Xiu died in 264 and was succeeded by his nephew Sun Hao as the emperor of Wu. Sun Hao promoted Lu Kang to the position of Senior General Who Guards the Army and appointed him as the nominal Governor of Yi Province even though Yi Province was not Wu territory. After the Wu general Shi Ji died in 270, Sun Hao put Lu Kang in charge of overseeing military affairs in Xinling, Xiling, Yidao, Le District, and Gong'an counties, with his administrative centre at Le District (east of present-day Songzi, Hubei).

Proposing 17 policy changes
When Lu Kang heard that there were many flaws in the Wu government's policies, he became worried so he wrote a memorial to Sun Hao as follows:  The 17 policy changes proposed by Lu Kang were lost over time.

Speaking up against corruption in the Wu government
When the official He Ding was abusing his authority and eunuchs were interfering in state affairs, Lu Kang wrote a memorial to advise Sun Hao:

Battle of Xiling

Initial stages
In 272, Bu Chan, the military commander stationed at Xiling (西陵; around present-day Yichang, Hubei), started a rebellion against Wu and wanted to defect to the Jin dynasty. When Lu Kang received news of the revolt, he immediately ordered his subordinates Zuo Yi, Wu Yan, Cai Gong and others to lead separate forces and head towards Xiling as directly as possible. He instructed his men to construct defensive structures all the way from Chixi to Gushi to form an encirclement around Bu Chan's position, while at the same time defending the area from attacks by Jin forces. He ordered them to work day and night to complete the construction works as if the enemy had already arrived, resulting in his soldiers being all tired and worn out.

Lu Kang's subordinates said: "With our current strength, we can attack Bu Chan and destroy him before Jin forces arrive. Why are we exhausting ourselves by constructing defensive structures instead?" Lu Kang explained: "Xiling's fortifications are very stable and it has sufficient supplies. Besides, I was the one who oversaw the construction of Xiling's defences. If we attack it now, I don't think we can conquer it easily. If Jin forces show up and we don't have adequate defensive structures, we will be trapped in between Bu Chan and Jin and have nothing to protect ourselves from the enemy." The officers repeatedly urged Lu Kang to attack Xiling but he refused. Eventually, Lei Tan, the Administrator of Yidu Commandery, came to see Lu Kang and used kind words to persuade him to attack Xiling. To prove that he was right, Lu Kang relented and ordered an assault on Xiling. As he expected, they did not succeed in capturing the city, so his officers gave up their idea of attacking and complied with Lu Kang's orders to construct the defensive structures.

Destruction of the dyke near Jiangling
When Jin forces led by Yang Hu were approaching Jiangling County, the Wu officers advised Lu Kang against leaving Jiangling to attack Xiling, but Lu Kang said: "Jiangling's fortifications are strong and it has sufficient troops to defend it, so there is no need to worry. Even if the enemy captures Jiangling, they won't be able to hold it for long and our losses will be minimal. However, if we lose Xiling, the tribes in the southern hills will be affected and this will lead to serious problems. I'd rather abandon Jiangling than give up on capturing Xiling. Besides, Jiangling is already very well-defended in the first place."

Jiangling was situated on flat lands and was a very accessible location. However, Lu Kang later ordered Zhang Xian to oversee the construction of a large dyke to block the river's flow and direct its waters to flood the flat lands, so as to create a large body of water around the city to serve as a barrier to invaders. When Yang Hu arrived, he planned to make use of this barrier by transporting supplies on boats, but he spread false news that he intended to destroy the dyke to make way for his land army to pass through. When Lu Kang heard that, he saw through Yang Hu's plot and ordered Zhang Xian to destroy the dyke. Lu Kang's officers were shocked and attempted to dissuade him from doing so because they thought he would be doing the enemy a favour, but Lu Kang ignored them. When Yang Hu reached Dangyang (當陽; southwest of present-day Jingmen, Hubei), he was dismayed to hear that the dyke had been destroyed. He had no choice but to transport his supplies on land, resulting in the wasting of time and effort.

Final stages
Xu Yin, the commander of the Jin garrison at Badong Commandery (巴東郡; around present-day Fengjie County, Chongqing), led naval forces towards Jianping (建平; around present-day Zigui County, Hubei), while Yang Zhao, the Inspector of Jing Province (also under Jin control), led troops towards Xiling. 

Lu Kang gave orders that: Zhang Xian reinforce Jiangling's defences; Sun Zun, the Commandant of Gong'an County, patrol the south river bank and resist Yang Hu; and Liu Lü and Zhu Wan guard against Xu Yin's attacks. He personally led three armies to hold off Yang Zhao with the aid of the defensive structures they had constructed earlier. However, Lu Kang's subordinates Zhu Qiao and Yu Zan defected to Yang Zhao's side. Lu Kang said: "Yu Zan has been serving under me for a long time and he is very aware of my situation. He knows that the tribal soldiers in my army may be unwilling to follow my orders, so he will definitely suggest to the enemy to take advantage of this weakness." Hence, that night, Lu Kang immediately replaced the tribal soldiers in his army with other veteran soldiers whom he trusted more. The following day, as Lu Kang expected, Yang Zhao concentrated his attacks on the unit in Lu Kang's army which used to be made up of tribal soldiers, without knowing that they had been replaced. Lu Kang ordered his archers to retaliate, raining arrows on the enemy and inflicting heavy casualties.

After about a month, Yang Zhao failed to overcome Lu Kang and had run out of ideas. So he withdrew his army on one night. Lu Kang wanted to pursue the enemy but he was worried that Bu Chan (who was still inside Xiling) might use the opportunity to attack him from behind, and he did not have enough troops with him. He then ordered his men to beat the drums and pretend to prepare to attack Yang Zhao's retreating forces. When Yang Zhao's men saw that, they were so terrified that they abandoned their armour and equipment and fled. Lu Kang sent a small group of lightly-armed soldiers to pursue Yang Zhao and they inflicted a crushing defeat on the enemy. Yang Hu and the other Jin generals withdrew their armies after receiving news of Yang Zhao's defeat. Lu Kang then attacked and conquered Xiling. Bu Chan, along with his family and high-ranking officers, were executed for treason, while the others, numbering over 10,000, were pardoned after Lu Kang made a request to the Wu court. Lu Kang then had Xiling's fortifications repaired before returning east to Le District (樂鄉; east of present-day Songzi, Hubei). He remained humble after his victory in Xiling and still behaved in the same manner as he did before. His humility earned him the respect and favour of his men.

Making peace with Yang Hu
The Jin Yang Qiu recorded that Lu Kang was on friendly terms with the Jin general Yang Hu even though they stood on opposing sides. Their friendship was likened to that of Zichan and Jizha during the Spring and Autumn period. Lu Kang once sent wine to Yang Hu, who drank it without showing any signs of suspicion. Later, when Lu Kang fell sick, Yang Hu sent medicine to him, which Lu Kang also took without suspecting anything. The people of that time remarked that the relationship between Lu Kang and Yang Hu was like that of Hua Yuan and Zifan during the Spring and Autumn period.

The Han Jin Chunqiu further described this uncanny friendship between Lu Kang and Yang Hu. After returning to Jin territory, Yang Hu started promoting morality and civility, and many Wu citizens were impressed with him. Lu Kang told the Wu forces stationed at the Wu-Jin border: "If they govern with virtue and we administer our state like tyrants, we will lose the war without even having to fight. I hope that you can guard the border well and not stir up problems over trivial matters." 

The Wu-Jin border experienced peace and stability as both sides actively practised détente and got along harmoniously with each other. If cattle from one side accidentally strayed across the border, the other side would allow the owners to cross the border and retrieve their cattle. During hunting expeditions at the border, if the citizens of either side were injured, the other would send them home safely. When Lu Kang fell sick, he asked for medicine from Yang Hu. Yang Hu obliged and said: "This medicine is of fine quality. I prepared it myself. I haven't tried it myself when I heard that you are ill so I sent it to you." Lu Kang's subordinates cautioned him against taking Yang Hu's medicine because they were worried that Yang Hu might harm him, but Lu Kang ignored them. When the Wu emperor Sun Hao received news of peaceful relations between Wu and Jin, he sent a messenger to reprimand Lu Kang, but Lu Kang replied: "Ordinary peasants in the countryside have to keep their promises, much less me, a government official. If I do not live the virtues, I will appear as a stark contrast to Yang Hu. This does not result in any harm to Yang Hu." However, there were some people who disagreed with the behaviour of Lu Kang and Yang Hu, as they believed that the two men were not fulfilling their loyalties to their respective states.

Xi Zuochi's commentary
Xi Zuochi, author of the Han Jin Chunqiu, commented on this issue as follows:

Later career

Speaking up against cruel and harsh laws
After the Battle of Xiling, Lu Kang was promoted to Protector-General. When he heard that Xue Ying, the Left Commandant of Wuchang, had been imprisoned, he wrote a memorial to Sun Hao:

Advising Sun Hao against waging war on Jin
When battles were constantly waged between Wu and Jin and the people were suffering in those times of war, Lu Kang wrote another memorial to Sun Hao:

Final advice to Sun Hao
In 273, Lu Kang was appointed as Grand Marshal and Governor of Jing Province. He fell sick in the summer of 274. During that time, he wrote a memorial to Sun Hao:

Descendants
Lu Kang died in the autumn of 274 sometime between 20 August and 17 September. His son, Lu Yan, inherited his titles. Lu Yan and his younger brothers – Lu Jing, Lu Xuan, Lu Ji and Lu Yun – shared command of their father's troops and served as generals in Wu. Lu Kang also had another son, Lu Dan, who was younger than Lu Yun.

Lu Yan was commissioned as a Major-General and he served as the commander of Yidao. In 280, the Jin dynasty launched a campaign against Eastern Wu. The Jin general Wang Jun led a naval fleet and sailed east towards Wu along the Yangtze River, capturing all the Wu territories along the way, just as Lu Kang had foreseen when he urged Sun Hao to strengthen the defences on Wu's western border. Lu Yan was killed in a battle against Wang Jun's forces on 22 March 280.

Lu Jing served as a general in Wu and was also killed in action during the Jin conquest of Wu. Lu Ji, Lu Yun and Lu Dan all came to serve the Jin dynasty after the fall of Wu. They were all executed along with their families during the War of the Eight Princes.

Appraisal
Chen Shou, who wrote Lu Kang's biography in the Sanguozhi, commented on Lu Kang as follows: "Lu Kang was loyal and faithful to his state, and was very capable and talented, much like his father. He had excellent moral conduct worthy of praise. He was also able to handle the overall situation well without neglecting details. He was thus able to accomplish such great tasks!"

See also
 Lists of people of the Three Kingdoms

Notes

References

 Chen, Shou (3rd century). Records of the Three Kingdoms (Sanguozhi).
 Pei, Songzhi (5th century). Annotations to Records of the Three Kingdoms (Sanguozhi zhu).
 

226 births
274 deaths
Eastern Wu generals
Eastern Wu politicians
Politicians from Yichang
Political office-holders in Hubei